The Las Vegas Stars was a professional basketball team in the International Basketball League. The inaugural head coach was George Tarkanian, son of famed coach Jerry Tarkanian.  The CEO/General Manager, Alexis Levi-Scott, became the first African American female owner in professional basketball when she purchased the team.

Season By Season

2008 roster
'Final 2007-08 Roster'

Head Coach: Dan Savage

Assistant Coach: Mike Meister

The Las Vegas Stars completed this season in first place in the Southwest Division.

2007 roster
'Final 2006-07 Roster'

Head Coach: Dan Savage

References

External links
unofficial team page

Sports teams in Las Vegas
Basketball teams in Nevada
2007 establishments in Nevada
Basketball teams established in 2007
Basketball in Las Vegas
2008 disestablishments in Nevada
Basketball teams disestablished in 2008